Licuala ramsayi is a species of plant in the family Arecaceae; its common name is the Queensland or Australian fan palm. Two varieties are recognised: Licuala ramsayi var. ramsayi, and Licuala ramsayi var. tuckeri.

Description 
The fruits are a red drupe around  diameter containing a single seed.

Distribution and habitat 
The species grows in swamps, along riverbanks, and in rainforests in Australia. In favourable conditions it may dominate small areas, forming a "fan palm forest". L. ramsayi var. tuckeri is found in Cape York Peninsula southwards to about Cooktown, while L. ramsayi var. ramsayi occurs from Cooktown to the Paluma Range north of Townsville. One of the most cold-tolerant Licuala species and the only one native to Australia.

Ecology
Trees provided an edible cabbage to Aboriginals, as well as thatch, food wrapping, and cigarette papers (from young leaves) Fruits are eaten by cassowaries.

Gallery

References

External links
 
 
Palm and Cycad Society of Australia

ramsayi
Trees of Australia
Flora of Queensland
Taxa named by Ferdinand von Mueller